Rock Island Trail may refer to:

Parks
 Rock Island Trail (Colorado), see Limon Railroad Depot

Rock Island Trail State Park
 Rock Island Trail State Park (Illinois), Illinois
 Rock Island Trail State Park (Missouri), Missouri

Other uses
 Rock Island Trail (film), a 1950 American Western film

See also 
 Rock Island State Park (disambiguation)
 Rock Island (disambiguation)